David Architzel (born 1951) is a retired Vice Admiral in the United States Navy. His last assignment was as Commander of Naval Air Systems Command (NAVAIR).

Vice Admiral Architzel was relieved by Vice Admiral David A. Dunaway and retired from nearly four decades of service on September 20, 2012.

Biography
Architzel was born in Ogdensburg, New York. He grew up in Merrick, New York and has one brother, Ralph, and two sisters, Reba and Anne Fleming. Architzel graduated from Sanford H. Calhoun High School in 1969. Among his classmates were Bennett "Ben" Cohen, Jerry Greenfield and his twin sister Anne.

Architzel graduated from the U.S. Naval Academy in 1973 with a B.S. degree in mathematics. He later earned an M.S. degree in aeronautical systems from the University of West Florida.

While serving as commanding officer of Guam and Theodore Roosevelt, his crew members were frequently treated to Ben & Jerry's ice cream by his high school classmates Ben Cohen and Jerry Greenfield.

On July 29, 2005, Architzel "assumed command as the fourth Program Executive Officer for Aircraft Carriers," according to the Navy's Web site.

Vice Adm. Architzel has accumulated over 5000 flight hours, 4300 in the S-3 Viking and the remainder in some 30 other aircraft types. His decorations include two Navy Distinguished Service Medals, the Defense Superior Service Medal, four Legions of Merit, three Meritorious Service Medals, the Navy Achievement Medal and various service related awards and campaign ribbons. He was also awarded the Spanish Naval Cross of Merit from His Majesty, King Juan Carlos of Spain, and the Navy League’s John Paul Jones Leadership Award for 1998. Architzel has been honored by Iceland by being made a Knight of the Order of the Falcon.

References
U.S. Navy Biography 

1951 births
Living people
People from Ogdensburg, New York
People from Merrick, New York
Sanford H. Calhoun High School alumni
United States Naval Academy alumni
United States Naval Aviators
University of West Florida alumni
Recipients of the Meritorious Service Medal (United States)
Recipients of the Legion of Merit
United States Navy vice admirals
Recipients of the Defense Superior Service Medal
Recipients of the Navy Distinguished Service Medal
Grand Knights with Star of the Order of the Falcon